San Tan Valley is an unincorporated community and census-designated place in northern Pinal County, Arizona, United States. As of the census of 2020, the population of San Tan Valley is 99,894.

History
San Tan Valley derives its name from the nearby San Tan Mountains.  The origin of the name San Tan is disputed, with suggestions ranging from a corruption of the name Santa Ana to the last name of George Santan, prior postmaster in nearby Gila County.  Previously referred to as San Tan Heights, San Tan Foothills, Greater San Tan and simply the San Tan Area, the community lacked any official name and residents used nearby Queen Creek for their mailing addresses.  To coincide with the addition of a new ZIP code for the community on July 1, 2009, the United States Postal Service was petitioned to provide the area with a new name. As part of the initial request, "Bella Vista" name was submitted to the postal service, drawing the ire of some local residents who opposed the suggested name.  In response, the Greater San Tan Area Coalition organized a non-binding vote on June 23, offering residents the opportunity to vote on a name for the community.

The area, which had consisted primarily of undeveloped desert and agriculture prior to 2000, experienced considerable growth in the early part of the decade.  As early as 2004, attempts to incorporate the area were underway.  An initial attempt, which proposed a name of simply "San Tan" for the area, was blocked by the neighboring town of Florence after rural residents there expressed concern that allowing incorporation would accelerate the urbanization of the area. A subsequent effort in 2005 failed to gain traction.  Following the renaming of the area in 2009, a renewed effort at incorporation sought to put the issue to a vote in 2010, this time with the support of Pinal County. The Town Council of Florence unanimously rejected a resolution that would have approved San Tan Valley's proposed boundaries over concerns of their allotment of state shared revenue.

Geography
San Tan Valley is located at  (33.170462, -111.572170).

San Tan Valley is located in the unincorporated area between the towns of Queen Creek to the north and west, and Florence to the south.  The area is also bound by the San Tan Mountains Regional Park on the west and the Gila River Indian Community on the southwest.  The area consists largely of planned communities, such as Pecan Creek South, San Tan Heights and Johnson Ranch.

Climate
Situated east of the San Tan Mountains, the community is located in the Sonoran Desert.  As such, it experiences the hot, arid summers and moderate winters that typify the area. According to the Köppen climate classification, San Tan Valley has a hot desert climate (abbreviated BWh).

Demographics

In 2010 San Tan Valley had a population of 81,321.  The racial and ethnic composition of the population was 66.2% non-Hispanic white, 5.0% black or African American, 1.2% Native American, 2.1% Asian, 0.3% Pacific Islander, 0.2% non-Hispanic reporting some other race and 23.4% Hispanic or Latino.

In 2020 San Tan Valley had a population of 99,894. The racial and ethnic composition of the population was 68.7% white, 5.0% black or African American, 1.4% Native American, 1.9% Asian, 0.4% Pacific Islander, 13.4% two more or races, 9.3% reporting some other race. The population was 25.4% Hispanic or Latino (of any race).

Education
San Tan Valley is serviced by the following school districts. Each district has its own high school located within San Tan Valley:
 Florence Unified School District (Poston Butte High School, San Tan Foothills High School))
 J. O. Combs Unified School District (Combs High School)

Emergency Services
 Pinal County Sheriff's Office
 Rural Metro Fire

Transportation
San Tan Valley does not have any public transportation service.

References

External links
 Google Map of San Tan Valley, Arizona
 SanTanValley.com
 Johnson Ranch Community Association

Unincorporated communities in Pinal County, Arizona
Populated places established in 2009
Phoenix metropolitan area
Unincorporated communities in Arizona